Nesotrinchus is a genus of beetles in the family Buprestidae, containing the following species:

 Nesotrinchus australicus (Kerremans, 1903)
 Nesotrinchus coeruleipennis (Fairmaire, 1877)
 Nesotrinchus thomsoni Bily & Kuban, 2009
 Nesotrinchus wallisii (Montrouzier, 1855)

References

Buprestidae genera